Jacksonwald is a census-designated place in Exeter Township, Berks County, Pennsylvania, United States.  It is located less than a mile from the borough of St. Lawrence.  As of the 2010 census, the population was 3,393 residents.

The Village of Jacksonwald was established in 1870, when John Jackson built the Jacksonwald Hotel on the corner of Oley Turnpike Road and Church Lane Road. The Hotel overlooked a little red schoolhouse which was also built in 1870, then restored in 1970 for its 100th anniversary. Prior to 1870, the area was once referred to as Schwarzwald, German for "black forest," because it reminded early settlers of the Black Forest region of Germany. Nevertheless, on March 27, 1967 the Jacksonwald Hotel was demolished to make way for a Boyertown headquartered bank branch, National Penn Bank.

Wald is the German word for woods or forests. Similarly to the etymology of other cities, towns and villages of the time, citizens often named their community after a prominent landmark or individual, hence the name Jacksonwald.

Demographics

References

Populated places in Berks County, Pennsylvania